John Krakauer  is an American neurologist and neuroscientist. He is currently the John C. Malone Professor of Neurology, Neuroscience, and Physical Medicine & Rehabilitation, the Director of the Brain, Learning, Animation, and Movement (BLAM) laboratory, and co-founder of the KATA project at Johns Hopkins University School of Medicine. His areas of interest range from motor learning, motor control, and stroke to bioethics. From 2003 until 2010, he was the codirector of the Motor Performance Laboratory at the Neurological Institute of Columbia University.
He received his bachelor's degree at Trinity College of Cambridge University. He completed the Osler internship at Johns Hopkins University and both his neurology residency and neurovascular fellowship at Columbia University.

Selected publications

References

Living people
American neurologists
American neuroscientists
Alumni of Trinity College, Cambridge
Columbia University Vagelos College of Physicians and Surgeons alumni
Johns Hopkins University faculty
Year of birth missing (living people)